Moryllus or Moryllos was a town of ancient Macedonia, placed by Ptolemy in the otherwise obscure district of Paraxia, then assumed to be in the district of Anthemus, but now it is placed, thanks to an inscription, in the interior Mygdonia or Crestonia, near modern Ano Apostoli, Kilkis prefecture. The only attested citizens of Moryllus are two Delphic theorodokoi, Hadymos and Seleukos sons of Argaios.

The site of Moryllus is located near modern Ano Apostoli.

References

Populated places in ancient Macedonia
Former populated places in Greece
Lower Macedonia
Kilkis (regional unit)
Cities in ancient Macedonia